Ectoedemia longicaudella is a moth of the family Nepticulidae. It is found from most of Europe (except Iceland, Ireland, Great Britain and Denmark), east to Belgorod and Kaluga in Russia. It is also present in the Near East.

The wingspan is 7-10.5 mm. Adults are on wing in June and July, in Yugoslavia adults have also been recorded in May and occasionally in early August.

The larvae feed on various Quercus species. Unlike most other Nepticulidae species, the larvae mine the bark of their host, rather than the leaves.

External links
Swedish Moths
Nepticulidae from the Volga and Ural region
A Taxonomic Revision Of The Western Palaearctic Species Of The Subgenera Zimmermannia Hering And Ectoedemia Busck s.str. (Lepidoptera, Nepticulidae), With Notes On Their Phylogeny

Nepticulidae
Moths described in 1953
Moths of Europe
Moths of Asia